Tàizǔquán (太祖拳, eng. Boxing of Tàizǔ or Great-Ancestor Fist) is a style of Chinese martial arts whose name refers to Emperor Tàizǔ of Sòng, the founder of the Sòng dynasty.  

There are two distinct variations of Tàizǔquán, the Northern Style: Tàizǔ Zhǎngquán (Eng. Taizu Changquan), and the Southern Style: Nán Tàizǔquán. Tàizǔ Zhǎngquán styles are taught in Guǎngdōng. Nán Tàizǔquán is taught in Táiwān. Both styles are found in Fújiàn.

Traditional Aphorisms
The essence of the style is to use the enemy's offense as means to control the enemy itself.

The routine moves are rigorous, the footwork is flexible, both firm and supple. 

The practitioner is like a cat; shaking like a tiger, walking like a dragon, and moving like lightning. 

It requires one courage, two strengths, three exercises, four breaths, five tricks, six changes, seven evils, and eight cruelties.

When attacking, check the situation and observe carefully; rush through the middle opening whenever weak, and step around when encountering a strong front.

The hands are connected with each other, up and down, attacking where there is a gap, and coming back together when there is a leak. 

Focus on actual offense and defense. Like the wind, the shock is like electricity, the front hand is led, the back hand chases, and the two hands are exchanged. 

The technique is either offensive or defensive, with the style's philosophy indicating that two are interchangeable.

Tàizǔquán Zhǎngquán 

According to Wu Bing and Liu Xiangyun, the Tàizǔ boxing method is the quintessential Shaolin (少 林 寺; Young Forest Temple) martial art (武 艺 ; Wǔyì) of the northern school, and is also called Taiziquan (太 子 拳).

Tàizǔquán has been associated with Zhǎngquán since the time of the Ming Dynasty because Ming general Qī Jìguāng (戚 繼 光) wrote "of the ancient and current families of boxing, the peaceful Taizu had thirty-six figures of Long Boxing". 

Practitioners of this style are found in mainly in Láizhōu, Shāndōng.

Tàizǔquán Zhǎngquán Routines 
This style of Zhǎngquán has the famous Sānshí'èr shì (三 十 二 势 ; 32 Techniques) mentioned in General Qī Jìguāng's Jìxiào xīnshū (紀 效 新 書; Eng. New Treatise on Military Efficiency).

Tàizǔ Zhǎngquán has 4 routines:
 Yīlù xiǎo zhàn quán (一 路 小 战 拳); 1st Road, Small Battle Fist
 Èrlù tài zhàn quán (二 路 太 战 拳);  2nd Road, Great Battle Fist
 Sānlù sàn zhàn quán (三 路 散 战 拳); 3rd Road, Three Battle Fist
 Sìlù hé zhàn quán (四 路 合 战 拳); 4th Road, Joined Battle Fist

Tàizǔquán in Cāngzhōu 
During the reign of the Kāngxī Emperor (1654-1722), Tàizǔquán was spread in the Cāngzhōu area of Héběi province.  

The bare-hand routines: 

Yīlù tàizǔ quán (一 路 太 祖 拳) 1st Road, Great-Ancestor Fist
Èrlù tàizǔ quán (二 路 太 祖 拳) 2nd Road, Great-Ancestor Fist
Shí tàng bā luóhàn quán (十 趟 八 罗 汉 拳) 10 lines of 8 Arhats Fist 
Liú tuǐ jià (遛 腿 架) Walking Leg Frame
Liú jiǎo shì (遛 脚 式) Walking Kick Technique
Bā dǎ, èrshí shì (八 打 二 十 式) 8 Strikes of 20 Techniques
Tàizǔ zhǎng quán (太 祖 长 拳) Great Ancestor Long Fist
Xíng bù quán (行 步 拳) Line Walking Fist
Shí'èr tàng dàntuǐ (十 二 趟 弹 腿) 12 Lines of Spring Legs

The routines with long weapons: 

Tàizǔ gùn (太 祖 棍) Great-Ancestor Staff
Sānjié gùn (三 节 棍) 3-Section Staff
Shàolín gùn (少 林 棍) Young Forest Staff
Shí'èr lián qiāng (十 二 连 枪) 12 Linked Spear
Méihuā qiāng (梅 花 枪) Plum Blossom Spear
Sìmén dàdāo (四 门 大 刀) 4 Gate Cleaver
Fāngbiàn chǎn (方 便 铲)  Convenient Shovel
Shuāngshǒu dài (双 手 带) Two Handed Sash

The routines with short weapons: 

Méihuā dāo (梅 花 刀) Plum Flower Saber
Wàn shèng dāo (万 胜 刀) 10,000 Victories Saber
Yìngzhàn dāo (应 战 刀) Answering Battle Saber
Qīnglóng jiàn (青 龙 剑) Blue Dragon Sword
Èr lǎng jiàn (二 朗 剑) Two Light Sword
Shuāng yuè (双 钺) Double Axe
Méihuā shuānggōu (梅 花 双 钩) Plum Flower Double Hook

The partner routines: 

Duìlián (对 连) Linked Pair
Duìdǎ tàizǔ gùn (对 打 太 祖 棍) Paired Strike Great-Ancestor Staff
Sānjié gùn jìn qiāng (三 节 棍 进 枪) 3-Section Staff Entering Spear
Dāndāo jìn qiāng (单 刀 进 枪) Single Saber Entering Spear
Dàdāo jìn qiāng (大 刀 进 枪) Cleaver Entering Spear
Zǐmǔ chuí duìdǎ (子 母 锤  对 打) Mother & Son Hammers Paired Strike

Nán Tàizǔquán 
Southern tàizǔquán is particularly common in Taiwan.  

The taolu or characteristic forms: 
 Xiǎo sìmén (小 四 門) Small 4 Gates
 Dà sìmén (大 四 門) Large 4 Gates
 Wǔ bù (五 步) 5 Steps
 Fēi bāguà (飛 八 卦) Flying 8 Hexagrams
 Luóhàn quán (羅 漢 拳) Arhat Fist
The forms with weapons: 

Tàizǔ gùn (太 祖 棍) Great-Ancestor Staff 
Sìmén dàdāo (四 门 大 刀) 4 Gate Saber 
Méihuā dāo (梅 花 刀) Plum Blossom Saber 
Wànshèng dāo (万 胜 刀) 10,000 Victories Saber 
Shuāng dāo (双 刀) Double Saber 
Méihuā shuānggōu (梅 花 双 钩) Plum Flower Double Hooks 
Shí'èr lián qiāng (十 二 连 枪) 12 Linked Spear  
Méihuā qiāng (梅 花 枪) Plum Blossom Spear 
Máodùn (矛 盾) Spear & Shield  
Hǔchā (虎 叉) Tiger Fork 
Liúxíng chuí (遛 行 锤) Walking Hammers 
Fāngbiàn chǎn (方 便 铲) Convenient Shovel 
Jiujié biān (九 节 鞭) 9-Section Whip 
Shuāngshǒu dài (双 手 带) Two Handed Sash  

The partner routines: 

Duìdǎ (對 打) Paired Strike
Gùn duìdǎ (棍 對 打) Paired Staff
Quán duì dāo (拳 對 刀) Fist vs Saber
Hǔchā duì dāo (虎 叉 對 刀 ) Tiger Fork vs Saber 
Sānjiégùn jìn qiāng (三 节 棍 进 枪) 3-Section Staff Entering Spear
Dāndāo jìn qiāng (单 刀 进 枪) Single Saber Entering Spear
Dàdāo jìn qiāng (大 刀 进 枪) Cleaver Entering Spear
Zǐmǔ chuí duìdǎ (子 母 锤 对 打) Mother & Son Hammers Paired Strike

See also
 Tiandihui
 Southern Shaolin Monastery
 Changquan
 Chang Moo Kwan
 List of Chinese martial arts

References

External links
 Duan Ping 段 平, Zheng Shouzhi 郑守志 and others, Wushu Cidian 武术 词典 Wushu Dictionary, Renmin Tiyu Chubanshe, 2007, 
 Carmona José, De Shaolin à Wudang, les arts martiaux chinois, Gui Trenadiel editeur, 
 Liu Lianyang 刘连 洋, Shandong Laizhou Taizuquan 山东 莱州 太祖 拳, article appeared in the magazine "Jingwu 精 武" at issue 8 of 2006
 Liu Lianyang 刘连 洋, Shandong Taizuquan Xinggong Xinjie 山东 太祖 拳 行 功 心 解, article appeared in the magazine "Jingwu 精 rivista" at issue 8 of 2006
 Zhang Liuqing 张 浏 青, Shaolinsi Taizu Changquan 少林寺 太祖 长拳, Chaohua chubanshe, 1999, 
 Wu Bing 武 兵 and Liu Xiangyun 刘向芸, Taizuquan zhu Shanxi de chuancheng 太祖 拳 住 山西 的 传承, article originally appeared in Jingwu magazine in issue 2 of 2008
Shifu Alan Tinnion Taizu Jin Suo 太 祖 金 鎖

Chinese martial arts